Thankamani Kutty is an Indian dancer. She is a Bharatanatyam and Mohiniattam dancer and teacher. She, and her late husband Govindan Kutty, are widely known for their contributions in promoting South Indian dance, music and theatre in West Bengal.

Awards
 Bharatmuni Samman 
 Pravasi Award for Dance from Government of Kerala
Nritya Natak Sangeet  Drishya Kala Akademy Award from Government of West Bengal

Books

References

Year of birth missing (living people)
Living people
Teachers of Indian classical dance
Performers of Indian classical dance
20th-century Indian dancers
21st-century Indian dancers
Indian female classical dancers
Bharatanatyam exponents
20th-century Indian women artists
21st-century Indian women artists
Women artists from Kerala
Women artists from West Bengal
Dancers from Kerala
Dancers from West Bengal